ET3 Global Alliance is an American open consortium of licensees dedicated to global implementation of Evacuated Tube Transport Technologies (ET3). It was founded by Daryl Oster in 1997 with the goal of establishing a global transportation system utilizing car-sized cargo and passenger  capsules traveling in 1.5m diameter tubes via frictionless superconductive maglev.

The initial proof of concept system could be built in as little 3 years for operational transport.

1997–2007 
Southwest Jiaotong University (SWJTU) became the first university institution to become licensees of the ET3 GA consortium. The most ET3 licensees held outside of the USA are held in China. SWJTU and individuals from China have contributed significant IP to the ET3 consortia. By 2007, Yaoping Zhang, a former professor of  SWJTU, began promoting ETT as "evolutionary transportation". Yaoping Zhang currently operates ET3 GA's subsidiary ET3 China Inc.

2008–present 
ET3 has filed a series of new patents in 2014 relating to the field of high-temperature superconductivity (HTS). As of 2016, more than 380 licenses have been sold in 22 different countries, including China, where ET3 claims that more than a dozen licenses have been sold. Daryl Oster and his team met with Tesla Motors/SpaceX CEO Elon Musk in late July, 2013, to discuss the technology, resulting in Musk promising an investment in a  prototype of ET3's design. According to the ET3 website new news was due to be released soon after March 14, 2020

See also
 Hyperloop
 Swissmetro, a project started in 1974
 Vactrain, first proposed 1914

References

External links
 ET3 Official Website

Hypothetical technology
Sustainable transport
Transport systems
American companies established in 1997